The Nagral, sometimes pronounced Nagrial, are a tribe found in the province of Punjab in Pakistan.

Punjabi tribes